A long-term resident in the European Union is a person who is not a citizen of an EU country but has resided legally and continuously within its territory for five years with a means of support (i.e. without recourse to the social assistance system of the host country) and fulfills some further requirements, as defined in Directive 2003/109/EC. The status permits the holder some of the rights of free movement afforded to EU/EEA citizens in the participating countries; of the EU countries Denmark and Ireland (and, prior to its withdrawal, the United Kingdom) do not participate in implementing the Directive. The implementation of the directive is left to the participating countries, with some national variations in the requirements for and benefits of long-term resident status.

Participating countries
Countries participating in the implementation of the directive include: 
 Austria
 Belgium
 Bulgaria
 Croatia
 Cyprus (Long term resident – EC)
 Czech Republic
 Estonia
 Finland
 France
 Germany
 Greece
 Hungary ( or EK letelepedési engedély)
 Italy ( or Soggiornante di lungo periodo – CE)
 Latvia
 Lithuania
 Luxembourg
 Malta
 Netherlands
 Poland
 Portugal
 Romania
 Slovakia
 Slovenia
 Spain
 Sweden

Implementation by country

Czech Republic 
A person holding a permanent residence permit along with a legal status of “EU long-term resident” of another EU Member State (hereinafter referred to as “a resident of another EU member state”) is entitled to file an application for a long-term residence permit if he/she intends to temporarily reside in the Czech Republic for more than 3 months.

Finland
Holders of an eligible residence permit (excluding asylum) can after five years of residence apply for status as a long-term EU resident in Finland, providing they have not resided outside the country for more than six months at a time and ten months in total. This status can be withdrawn if the holder has continuously resided outside the EU for more than two years, or outside Finland for more than six years.

Those holding long-term EU resident status from another EU country wishing to reside in Finland may do so from that country or in Finland.

Netherlands
In order to acquire status as a long-term EU resident in the Netherlands, one must pass the civic integration exam and have five consecutive years residence on non-work permit separately with the Employee Insurance Agency. Additionally, status holders coming for employment will only require a work permit for the first 12 months, as opposed to the ordinary five years.

Sweden

Before 2019, the law was such that, in order to acquire status as a long-term EU resident in Sweden, one must have resided in Sweden continuously for five years on residence permits and have a permanent residence permit. Since 2019, a person who has stayed in Sweden for five years without interruption with a residence permit or "legally resident in another way" may apply for long-term resident status. This law change was made so that British citizens living in Sweden after Brexit would be able to apply for the status, because otherwise they would have been ineligible given they have lived in Sweden under right of residence, not with residence permits.

The person applying must also have a means of supporting themselves. However, time on visitor's residence permit or residence permit for studies, among others, cannot be counted towards this time.

Long-term EU residents moving to Sweden are required to apply for a residence permit if they stay for more than 90 days. They are however permitted to begin work or studies upon arrival, without waiting for a decision in such case. A work permit is not required for a long-term EU resident, however a hiring certificate must be submitted for such residents applying on the grounds of employment.

Reception
Following the deadline for the introduction of a specific immigration status as a long-term resident of the European Union in 2006, the Directive was found to affect a relatively small percentage of the third-country nationals in most participating countries. Additionally, of these, few used their mobility rights within the EU.

Main reasons cited for lack of adoption are the following:
 the lack of information available about the LTR status among third-country nationals
 the lack of information available about the LTR status among national migration administrations
 the "competition" with national schemes:
 national long-term residence permits, and
 possibility to obtain EU citizenship in 5 years or shorter time in some countries
 the "competition" with the Blue Card (European Union)
 integration requirements

Main reasons cited for lack of intra-EU mobility for third-country nationals with LTR are the following:
 labour market restrictions and labour market tests in States different than those in which they originally resided
 administrative barriers
 recognition of degrees and diplomas
 integration requirements
 long-term resident permits issued in one EU country may be exchanged to non-long-term resident permits in a new country 
 impossibility of cross-border work
 other forms of discrimination

Additional information
According to the chapter IV, Article 24 of the Directive, periodically the Commission reports to the European Parliament and to the Council on the application of this Directive in the Member States and proposes amendments as may be necessary. Reports provide information on specifics of application of the Directive in national legislation systems, as well as statistics of adoption of this type of residence permit.

There were 2,861,306 long-term residents by the end of 2018, with 69.8% of them with permit issued by Italy.

Brexit and UK nationals with long-term EU residence 
Long-term EU residence is what is recommended by Commission to be granted to UK nationals after Brexit, who lived in EU countries for more than 5 years. The rights obtained by UK nationals after converting to third-country nationals with LTR status would be significantly reduced in comparison to the set of rights exercised by them previously while being EU citizens.

See also
 Blue Card (European Union)

References

European nationality law
Residency
Foreign relations of the European Union